The Three Natural Bridges are a series of natural limestone bridges located in Xiannüshan Town, Wulong District, Chongqing Municipality, China. They lie within the Wulong Karst National Geology Park, itself a part of the South China Karst-Wulong Karst UNESCO World Heritage Site. In Chinese, the bridges are all named after dragons, namely Tianlong Qinglong and Heilong.

Description

Spanning the Yangshui River, a tributary of the Wu River, the bridges are at the centre of a  conservation area which also includes:

 Qinglong Tiankeng (青龙天坑);
 Shenying Tiankeng (神鹰天坑);
 Yangshui River Karst Canyon (羊水河喀斯特峡谷);
 Longshui Gorge (龙水峡地缝);
 Central Shiyuan Tiankeng (中石院天坑);
 Lower Shiyuan Tiankeng (下石院天坑);
 Seventy-two Branch Cave (七十二岔洞);
 Longquan Cave (龙泉洞);
 Immortal Cave (仙人洞);
 Hidden Monkey Stream (猴子坨伏流);
 Hidden Baiguo Stream (白果伏流).

Given that the distance between the upper end of the Tianlong Bridge and the lower end of the Heilong Bridge is only , these are not the longest natural bridges. However, they are the only such group of karst structures in the world. Between the bridges lie the Qinglong and Shenying tiankengs which have a depth of 276–285 metres and a circumference of 300–522 metres.

Dimensions

See also
Wulong Karst
Furong Cave
Xueyu Cave
Tianmen Mountain

References

External links

Wonders of Nature: Wulong National Geological Park
China: Three Natural Bridges National Geopark

Natural arches of China
Karst formations of China
Landforms of Chongqing
Limestone formations
Tourist attractions in Chongqing
World Heritage Sites in China